Falih Rıfkı Atay (1894– 20 March 1971) was a Turkish journalist, writer and politician between 1923 and 1950.

Biography
Falih Rıfkı was the son of Halil Hilmi Efendi, an imam. He was educated in Istanbul, Ottoman Empire. Falih began his career as a journalist in the Tanin, a CUP newspaper. He later became the private secretary of Talat Pasha, and during World War I accompanied Cemal Pasha in the Sinai and Palestine Campaign. After the war, he, with three other friends, founded the newspaper Akşam supporting the Turkish War of Independence. From 1919 to 1920 Falih Rıfkı was one of the contributors of Büyük Mecmua magazine which also supported the war of independence. On September 9th, 1922, he travelled to the liberated Izmir to visit Mustafa Kemal Atatürk with Yakup Kadri and arrived on the 13th of September just before the fire. Later, he became an editor-in-chief in the Hakimiyet-i Milliye. He entered politics in 1923, and served as deputy of Bolu and later Ankara in the parliament until the 1950 Turkish general election.

He was the author of more than 30 works.

Falih Rıfkı Atay died on 20 March 1971 in Istanbul. He was interred there at Zincirlikuyu Cemetery.

Legacy
A nature park inside the Belgrad Forest in Sarıyer district of Istanbul Province was named in his honor in 2011.

Selected works
 Ateş ve Güneş, (Fire and Sun), 1918, Memories of World War I in Syria and Palestine
 Zeytindağı (Mount of Olives), 1932, Memories of World War I in Syria and Palestine  
 Yeni Rusya (New Russia), 1931, Travelbook
 Çankaya (See Çankaya Mansion), 1952 and 1962, Memories of Mustafa Kemal Ataturk
 Babanız Atatürk, 1955, Memories of Mustafa Kemal Ataturk

Joint works 

 İzmir’den Bursa’ya, (From Izmir to Bursa), 1922, Greek Atrocities during the Greek Occupation of Western Anatolia, co-authors: Halide Edip, Yakup Kadri, Ruşen Eşref and Asım Us.

Notes

External links

20th-century Turkish journalists
20th-century writers from the Ottoman Empire
1894 births
1971 deaths
Burials at Zincirlikuyu Cemetery
Deputies of Ankara
Deputies of Bolu
20th-century journalists from the Ottoman Empire
Members of the 2nd Parliament of Turkey
Members of the 3rd Parliament of Turkey
Members of the 4th Parliament of Turkey
Members of the 5th Parliament of Turkey
Members of the 6th Parliament of Turkey
Members of the 7th Parliament of Turkey
Members of the 8th Parliament of Turkey
Politicians from Istanbul
Republican People's Party (Turkey) politicians